Seven Ages of Britain is a 2003 British documentary television series. The seven part series was shown by Channel 4 between 15 November and 20 December 2003.

Episodes

2010 BBC series by the same title 
The BBC aired a later series by the same title in 2010 presented by David Dimbleby and covering a narrower time period.

References

External links 
 Seven Ages of Britain at Channel 4

Channel 4 documentary series
2003 British television series debuts
2003 British television series endings